Ronan the Barbarian is a comic fantasy novel by James Bibby, first published in 1995 by Millennium. It is the first book in a trilogy, followed by Ronan's Rescue and Ronan's Revenge. It is also the first work set in Bibby's Midworld, a fictional universe constructed to parody common high fantasy and sword and sorcery genre tropes.

References 

1995 British novels
English fantasy novels